In Zaltsikn Yam (In the Salty Sea) also known as In Zaltsikn Yam Fun Di Mentshleche Trern (In the Salty Sea of Human Tears), or Tsum Bund: In Zaltsikn Yam Fun Di Mentshleche Trern is a Yiddish poem written by S. Ansky in 1901, that became a popular Yiddish song when music was added to it. The poem and song is dedicated to the socialist, General Jewish Labour Bund.

Recordings
 "Once upon a time" (Amol Iz Geven A Mayse), compiled and narrated by Joseph Mlotek
 "In Love And In Struggle: The Musical Legacy Of The Jewish Labor Bund", featuring Zalmen Mlotek, Adrienne Cooper, Dan Rous with The New Yiddish Chorale & The Workmen's Circle Chorus

Lyrics
Yiddish:

(First and part of second lines only)
אין זאַלטציקן ים פֿון די מענטשלעכע טרערן, געפֿינט זיך

English Transliteration:

English:

Beneath the salt sea of humanity's weeping
A terrible chasm abides
It couldn't be darker, it couldn't be deeper
It's stained with a bloody red tide

So much of the sea has been filled with this sorrow
Endured by the suffering jews
But only the tears of the poor ones are bloody
The rich cry as clear as the dew

Yes, only the workers the paupers the beggers,
Belong to this bloody abyss
While those you called brothers, the rich and the greedy,
Fly high overhead in their bliss

And thousands of years have created this chasm
Of piety, hatred, and pain
And for thousands of years all humanity's weeping
Flows like a limitless rain

Yes where are the ones that will stand at the ready
To dive in the chasm and fight
Yes, who will at last free the work from slavery,
Give hunger its final relief?
And who will be guiding the pathway to freedom,
To brotherhood, justice and peace?

The new Jewish worker the banner will carry
To signal that justice is done
The world will be freed and be healed by this hero,
Who dives to the root of its wound.
In Russia, in Vilna, in Poland all hail now
The Great Jewish Worker’s Bund!

The entire Yiddish original and a more complete translation can be accessed here: https://yiddishkayt.org/the-salt-sea/.

References

External links
 A recording

1901 songs
Bundist songs
Yiddish-language songs